This is a list of high school athletic conferences in the state of Delaware.

There are two public school conferences:
The Blue Hen Conference includes schools in New Castle County.
The Henlopen Conference includes schools in Kent County and Sussex County.

There are three private school conferences:
The Catholic Conference comprises girls' programs at Catholic schools.
The Delaware Independent School Conference comprises six schools including one school in Pennsylvania.
The Diamond State Athletic Conference contains both private schools and certain charter schools (other charter schools compete in the public school conferences).

There are also Non-Conference teams, which are not aligned with any of the available conferences

External links
High school sports standings hosted by Salesianum School lists schools by conference